The 2016 Pepsi Tankard, the provincial men's curling championship of New Brunswick was held February 3 to 7 at the Riverside Country Club in Rothesay, New Brunswick.  The winning Mike Kennedy rink represented New Brunswick at the 2016 Tim Hortons Brier in Ottawa.

Teams
The teams are listed as follows:

Round-robin standings

Scores

February 3
Draw 1
Kennedy 9-7 Roach
Comeau 10-9 Grattan
Perron 7-5 Mallais
Odishaw 6-2 Tallon

Draw 2
Grattan 10-5 Odishaw
Roach 7-2 Mallais
Comeau 11-4 Tallon
Kennedy 9-3 Perron

February 4
Draw 3
Mallais 8-5 Comeau
Perron 8-4 Tallon
Kennedy 7-5 Odishaw
Roach 6-5 Grattan

Draw 4
Grattan 9-2 Tallon  
Odishaw 7-5 Comeau  
Perron 5-4 Roach
Kennedy 7-5 Mallais

February 5
Draw 5
Kennedy 6-4 Comeau
Grattan 4-7 Perron
Odishaw 7-4 Mallais
Roach 9-3 Tallon

Draw 6
Mallais 7-9 Tallon
Roach 3-8 Odishaw
Kennedy 7-3 Grattan
Perron 8-2 Comeau

February 6
Draw 7
Odishaw 7-4 Perron
Tallon 4-7 Kennedy
Comeau 3-7 Roach
Grattan 8-7 Mallais

Playoffs

Semifinal

Final

References

2016 Tim Hortons Brier
Curling competitions in New Brunswick
Kings County, New Brunswick
Greater Saint John
2016 in New Brunswick